The Grêmio Recreativo Escola de Samba São Clemente is a samba school from Rio de Janeiro, located in the Cidade Nova neighborhood, on Avenida Presidente Vargas.

The school became famous over the years for plots regarded as full of good humor, and sarcastic criticism of the most diverse themes. São Clemente also has sand beach soccer teams in various categories, commonly considered to be one of the few great teams of this sport that does not belong to the Copacabana-Leblon axis.

The constant oscillation between the main groups of carnival brought it the nickname of "yo-yo" school. Due to history lines panfletics of the 1980 the school also became known as the "PT of samba". In the current decade, however, the school has been trying to print a new style to make carnival.

With the fire of Cidade do Samba, the school succeeded to stay in the Special Group, doing some good fashion and betting on the old with the new, with Fábio Ricardo and with Rosa Magalhães.

Classifications

References 

Samba schools of Rio de Janeiro
1961 establishments in Brazil